Antonio Muñoz Martínez (born 29 October 1959) is a Spanish Socialist Workers' Party (PSOE) politician. He has been a city councillor in Seville since 2011 and the city's mayor since 2022.

Biography
Born in La Rinconada, Province of Seville, Muñoz relocated to Barcelona at the age of 3 due to his father's construction work. His father was then transferred back to Andalusia, taking the family to Fuengirola; he had a brief time back in La Rinconada due to his mother's illness. He graduated in Economic and Business Sciences from the University of Málaga, where he began to affiliate with left-wing politics, joining the Spanish Socialist Workers' Party (PSOE) in 1983. He was elected the same year to the city council in La Rinconada, where he remained for eight years.

Muñoz gained a Master of Business Administration degree from the San Telmo Business School, also in Málaga, and became director general of Tourism Planning for the Regional Government of Andalusia. In 2011, he was elected to Seville's city council as sixth on the PSOE's list, and became an assistant spokesman for the party group. As the councillor for Urban Space, Culture and Tourism, he worked to attract events to Seville including the Goya Awards, the Michelin Awards, the MTV Europe Music Awards and a visit by Barack Obama.

In June 2021, mayor Juan Espadas became the PSOE candidate for President of the Regional Government of Andalusia, resigning his local office in December. On 3 January 2022, Muñoz was invested as mayor.

Personal life
Muñoz is openly gay. As of January 2022, he had been in a relationship with the novelist Fernando Repiso for over twenty years.

References

1959 births
Living people
People from La Rinconada
People from Fuengirola
University of Málaga alumni
Spanish Socialist Workers' Party politicians
Seville city councillors
Mayors of Seville
LGBT mayors of places in Spain
Gay politicians